"If I Was a Cowboy" is a song by the American country music singer Miranda Lambert. It was released on October 15, 2021, as the lead single from her ninth solo studio album Palomino. The song was written by Lambert and Jesse Frasure, and produced by Luke Dick and Jon Randall.

Background
On October 8, 2021, Lambert posted a video on Instagram and teased her fans with a snippet of the song. She wrote the song with Frasure, and said in a press release, "We met doing the remix of 'Tequila Does' and he and I just got together one afternoon for a write and this is what came out of it. It's funny, he's a Detroit boy and I'm an East Texan, but somehow we wrote a song about the Wild West together."

Content
Emily Lee of iHeart described "If I Was a Cowboy" as "a Wild West-inspired track". Angela Stefano of Taste of Country explained that the song is about "longing for life in the wild West".

Critical reception
Casey Young of Whiskeyriff called the song "a country version of Beyoncé's hit "If I Were a Boy". Clayton Edwards of Outsider said that it "[is] steeped in classic Western sound with a modern flair", describing the lyrics as "Lambert daydreaming about being a cowboy".

Music videos
Two music videos were mde. The first was released on October 15, 2021. It showcases Lambert "riding a horse, driving a vintage pickup truck", and enjoying the leisurely western life. The official video, directed by Trey Fanjoy, was released on January 12, 2022. It was filmed in a small town in her home state of Texas.

Charts

Weekly charts

Year-end charts

Certifications

Release history

References

2021 singles
2021 songs
Miranda Lambert songs
Songs written by Miranda Lambert
Songs written by Jesse Frasure
RCA Records Nashville singles